= Tamaz Chakhvadze Stadium =

1. REDIRECT Draft:Tamaz Chakhvadze Stadium
